Talhatta is a village and union council (an administrative subdivision) of Mansehra District (Tehsil Balakot) Kaghan Valley, in the Khyber-Pakhtunkhwa province of Pakistan. It is located in the south of the district where its borders Slightly touches Kashmir (Muzaffarabad District). River Kunhar's (کُنہار) Sloping water also passes through Talhatta, River's Water is coming from Snowy peaks of Naran & Kaghan. Talhatta is a large village of Sadaats & having Separate position of Sadaat in District Mansehra. Sadaats of Talhatta are the Descendants of Pir Baba Boner Swat (Syed Ali Tirmzi). Syed Qutab Shah Was the Founder of Talhatta,s Sadaats. Talhatta is categorized in four centrally Mohalla jaat, Named, Mastajir Mohalla, Masjid mohalla, Kashkar & upper Mohalla.

Most of the persons of Talhatta's are Literate, That's why education point of view Talhatta has prominent position, having former govt. Boys high school has now been upgraded to Higher Secondary School, Girls also have govt. Higher Secondary school. BHU (Basic health unit) facility is available. Paved streets and infrastructure condition is better as compared to other villages. Talhatta is also a union council spread from Village Hassari to Kotballah.

References
https://www.facebook.com/villagetalhatta

Union councils of Mansehra District
Populated places in Mansehra District